Ibis Styles is a French economy hotel brand focused on in-style stays and owned by Accor. Created in 1980 in Australia with the name All Seasons, the brand was acquired by Accor in 1999 and renamed Ibis Styles in 2011. Ibis Styles manages 476 hotels in 45 countries (2018).

History

1980: All Seasons 

The hotel chain All Seasons was created in Australia in 1980. By 1999, it operated 27 hotels when it was acquired by the French hotel group Accor.

In 2007, Accor relaunched All Seasons in France, making it a non-standardized economy brand focused on stylish designs. The pillow logo was introduced. In 2010, the All Seasons network of hotels reached 100 locations.

2011: Ibis Styles 

In September 2011, Accor rebranded All Seasons into Ibis Styles, and Etap Hôtel into Ibis Budget, turning Ibis into the group's economy megabrand. The "Sweet Bed" was rolled out throughout the Ibis brands, the first bed entirely designed by a hotel group.  The mattresses, pillows and digital access were upgraded. The lobby was turned into a living space. Following this restructuration, the Ibis megabrand became the leading hotel operator in Europe in 2013 with 1,277 hotels. The first Ibis Styles signs were installed in December 2012.

From 2011 to 2014, the number of Ibis Styles hotels increased by 65% reaching 250 locations in 21 countries. In 2016, Accor announced the launch of Ibis Styles in the United States, near the LaGuardia Airport in New York, at the London Heathrow Airport. and in India. In Africa, Ibis Styles became the hotel chain with the most planned openings.

In 2018, Ibis Styles opened the first hotel entirely dedicated to European comics in Geneva. In 2019, Ibis Styles introduced Lit'maginaire (Bed'maginary), an augmented reality application connected to a pillow and simulating a trip into space. In January 2020, Ibis Styles launched in the Philippines.

The last remaining hotel with the old All Seasons name is located in Jakarta.

Description 

Ibis Styles is an economy hotel brand focused on in-style stays and owned by Accor. Each hotel reflects the spirit of its location. Ibis Styles manages 476 hotels in 45 countries (2018).

Ibis Styles is part of the Ibis family, which also includes the brands Ibis (or "Ibis Red") and Ibis Budget.

Development

Awards 
 2015: Best Marketing Campaign Award at the Worldwide Hospitality Awards

See also 
 Accor
 Ibis (hotel)
 Ibis Budget

References 

Accor
French brands
All Seasons